The Montgomery Ward Building is a historic department store building located at Lewistown, Mifflin County, Pennsylvania. The east facade faces the Mifflin County Courthouse on Monument Square. It was built in 1929 in the Art Deco style, and consists of the store building and attached office building.  The store is two-stories, with a mezzanine level and measures approximately 40 feet by 150 feet.  The office building is two-stories and measures approximately 30 feet by 145 feet.  They are both of steel frame construction with brick exterior walls and feature terra cotta ornamentation.  It was one of the initial retail outlets constructed by the Montgomery Ward Company.

It was added to the National Register of Historic Places in 1984.

This is an impressive example of Art Deco style architecture which includes two-story bay windows and pilasters, bands of glazed terra-cotta panels and a female figure holding a torch. This image was a standard Montgomery Ward logo known as the “Spirit of Progress.” The building suffered a major fire on December 20, 1936 but was renovated and the business thrived until Montgomery Ward went out of business in the early 1980s. 

The entire building was remodeled into offices in the 1980s and currently houses a variety of businesses including In Home Services of Central PA, United Cerebral Palsy, Snowflake's On The Square Christmas Shop, and the Mifflin-Juniata Arts Council.

References

External links
 "Montgomery Ward Building" Waymark

Commercial buildings on the National Register of Historic Places in Pennsylvania
Commercial buildings completed in 1929
Economy of Pennsylvania
Department stores on the National Register of Historic Places
Montgomery Ward
Art Deco architecture in Pennsylvania
Buildings and structures in Mifflin County, Pennsylvania
National Register of Historic Places in Mifflin County, Pennsylvania
1929 establishments in Pennsylvania